Upside-Down Magic is a Disney Channel Original Movie and adaptation of the eponymous fantasy book series by Sarah Mlynowski, Lauren Myracle, and Emily Jenkins. The film stars Izabela Rose and Siena Agudong. It premiered on Disney Channel on July 31, 2020.

Plot
Best friends Elinor "Nory" Boxwood-Horace and Reina Carvajal discover they have magical powers: Nory can transform into animals and Reina can control fire. They enroll at Sage Academy, a prestigious magic school.

At Sage Academy, there are different classes for each student: the Flare class for students who can create fire with their hands, the Fluxer class for those who can turn into animals, the Flyer class is for those who can fly a few feet from the ground, the Fuzzy class for those who can talk to animals, and the Flicker class for those who can levitate things to them with the flick of a finger. The duo must test their magical powers to see if they are fit to be in the honors-level classes for their magic category.

During the test, Reina shows off her flare skills while Nory unintentionally transforms into a cat/dragon hybrid while trying to turn into a cat. Reina is placed in the Honors Flare class, but Nory is placed in the Upside-Down Magic program, a problem for students who have imperfect abilities as Headmistress Knightslinger considers them to be easy targets for the Shadow Magic, an evil force that uses a person's magic against everyone else through possession. As Nory and her fellow students secretly plan to perfect their abilities while assisting Budd in his grounds keeping, Headmistress Knightslinger is unaware that the Shadow Magic has ways of targeting the most unlikely students.

Reina discovers a book about Shadow Magic and, unaware of the Shadow Magic legend that Nory and the other UDMs were taught, takes the book to the dorm and finds a page about strengthening magical abilities. Reina reads the page because she was being belittled by a fellow Flare student named Phillip who has more Flare experience than her, and even her strange new friend Chandra is unable to fully help her.

Budd finds that his students are working to perfect their abilities in secret and agrees to help them while keeping Headmistress Knightslinger from finding out.

The next day, Reina prepares for Founders’ Day, where Reina competes against Phillip. Reina's powers are unusually strong and she gets to represent the Flares. Nory attempts to crash the competition by turning into a kitten, but instead becomes a wild boar/cat/dragon hybrid. Reina uses Nory's favorite Flare move to snap Nory out of it, but it almost burns Nory because Reina's powers have been so unusually strengthened.

The Shadow Magic book starts appearing after where Reina goes when she tries to get rid of it, and Chandra acts increasingly strange and has knowledge of the book. Reina tells Chandra to take the book with her. Chandra takes it, but it just reappears in Reina’s room. Chandra is revealed to be an embodiment of Shadow Magic in human form the next day when the other Flares cannot see who Reina is talking to. Chandra manipulates Reina and possesses her. At Founders' Day, Reina goes up to represent the Flares and uses a complicated Flare trick and becomes a shadow-like being who threatens to destroy the entire school. Eventually, it is the UDMs who are able to rescue Reina and return her to normal enough for her to defeat the Shadow Magic.

After the incident, Nory and the UDMs are moved into their respective magic classes and Budd is now an official Fuzzy teacher. In a post-credit scene, the Shadow Magic book falls off the shelf as it opens on a specific page that shows the magic logo with one symbol that has been removed in the normal magic logo. Shadow Magic is not fully defeated and it seems to have its own lost category of magic that it wants to show the world at any destructive cost.

Cast
 Izabela Rose as Elinor "Nory" Boxwood-Horace, a 13-year old abnormal Fluxer who can transform into unusual hybrid animals like a Dritten (a cat/dragon hybrid).
 Siena Agudong as Reina Carvajal, Nory's best friend and Flare student who can manipulate fire.
 Kyle Howard as Budd Skriff, the teacher of the Upside Down Magic school and groundskeeper who is later revealed to be an abnormal Fuzzy that can only communicate to animals by singing.
 Elie Samouhi as Elliot Cohen, an abnormal Flare who can make smoke instead of fire.
 Alison Fernandez as Pepper Paloma, an abnormal Flicker who can push things away from her.
 Max Torina as Andres Padillo, an abnormal Flyer who can fly to increasingly high heights and has trouble coming back down causing him to use a rope or weight to keep him on the ground.
 Vicki Lewis as Linda Knightslinger, the headmistress of Sage Academy.
 Yasmeen Fletcher as Chandra, a manifestation of Shadow Magic who can only be seen by Reina
 Callum Seagram Airlie as Phillip, a student in the Flare class who belittles and competes with Reina.
 Cynthia Kaye McWilliams as Professor Argon, the teacher of the Flare class.
 Elaine Kao as Professor Han, the teacher of the Fluxer class.
 Amitai Marmorstein as Professor Lewis, the teacher of the Flicker class.

Production

Development and casting
Disney Channel optioned the book series in 2015. Production began in August 2019 with the cast announcement. Joe Nussbaum directed and executive produced the film, with Suzanne Farwell and Susan Cartsonis also executive producing; Nick Pustay and Josh Cagan worked on the teleplay.

Filming
Principal photography took place on Vancouver Island. Shawnigan Lake School was used as the setting for Sage Academy, with students used as extras.

Release
Upside-Down Magic premiered on Disney Channel on July 31, 2020.

Accolades

References

External links

2020s children's fantasy films
2020 television films
Disney Channel Original Movie films
Films about magic
Films based on children's books
Films shot in British Columbia
2020 films
Films directed by Joe Nussbaum
2020s English-language films
2020s American films